Bob Walker is an English artist notable for his work with Hawkwind, including the "Ledge of Darkness" graphic novel and inner sleeve of The Chronicle of the Black Sword Album. Bob Walker lives in Melbourne, Australia.

References
Carol Clerk The Saga of Hawkwind (Published by Music Sales Ltd)

Living people
Year of birth missing (living people)
English comics artists
Place of birth missing (living people)
English illustrators
Hawkwind
Psychedelic artists